Corine Hierckens (born 30 May 1982) is a former Belgian racing cyclist. She won the Belgian national road race title in 2005.

References

External links
 

1982 births
Living people
Belgian female cyclists
People from Verviers
Cyclists from Liège Province